Time, Time is a 1967 album by pop vocalist Ed Ames.

Track listing

Side 1
"Time, Time (Tu As Beau Sourire)" – 2:50
"Michelle" – 3:20
"Pretend" – 2:33
"Somethin' Stupid" – 2:24
"Here with You" – 2:42
"Cabaret" – 3:25

Side 2
"One Little Girl at a Time" – 2:31
"Wish Me a Rainbow" – 2:36
"Love That Lasts Forever" – 3:13 
"Sunrise, Sunset" – 3:19
"What the World Needs Now Is Love" – 2:54

Production 
 Recorded at: RCA Victor's Music Center of the World, Hollywood, California and Webster Hall, New York City.

References

1967 albums
Ed Ames albums
RCA Victor albums